A Biopesticide is a biological substance or organism that damages, kills, or repels organisms seens as pests. Biological pest management intervention involves predatory, parasitic, or chemical relationships.

They are obtained from organisms including plants, bacteria and other microbes, fungi, nematodes, etc. They are components of integrated pest management (IPM) programmes, and have received much practical attention as substitutes to synthetic chemical plant protection products (PPPs).

Definitions 

Definitions:

The U.S. Environmental Protection Agency states that biopesticides "are certain types of pesticides derived from such natural materials as animals, plants, bacteria, and certain minerals, and currently, there are 299 registered biopesticide active ingredients and 1401 active biopesticide product registrations." The EPA also states that biopesticides "include naturally occurring substances that control pests (biochemical pesticides), microorganisms that control pests (microbial pesticides), and pesticidal substances produced by plants containing added genetic material (plant-incorporated protectants) or PIPs".

The European Environmental Agency defines a biopesticide as “a pesticide made from biological sources, that is from toxins which occur naturally. - naturally occurring biological agents used to kill pests by causing specific biological effects rather than by inducing chemical poisoning.” Furthermore, the EEA defines a biopesticide as a pesticide in which “the active ingredient is a virus, fungus, or bacteria, or a natural product derived from a plant source. A biopesticide's mechanism of action is based on specific biological effects and not on chemical poisons.”

Types 
Biopesticides usually have no known function in photosynthesis, growth or other basic aspects of plant physiology. Many chemical compounds produced by plants protect them from pests; they are called antifeedants. These materials are biodegradable and renewable, which can be economical for practical use. Organic farming systems embraces this approach to pest control.

Biopesticides can be classified thusly:
 Microbial pesticides consist of bacteria, entomopathogenic fungi or viruses (and sometimes includes the metabolites that bacteria or fungi produce). Entomopathogenic nematodes may be classed as microbial pesticides, even though they are multicellular.
 Bio-derived chemicals. Four groups are in commercial use: pyrethrum, rotenone, neem oil, and various essential oils are naturally occurring substances that control (or monitor in the case of pheromones) pests and microbial disease.
 Plant-incorporated protectants (PIPs) incorporate genetic material from other species (i.e. GM crops). Their use is controversial, especially in European countries.
 RNAi pesticides, some of which are topical and some of which are absorbed by the crop.

RNA interference 
RNA interference is under study for use in spray-on insecticides (RNAi insecticides) by companies including Syngenta and Bayer. Such sprays do not modify the genome of the target plant. The RNA can be modified to maintain its effectiveness as target species evolve to tolerate the original. RNA is a relatively fragile molecule that generally degrades within days or weeks of application. Monsanto estimated costs to be on the order of $5/acre.

RNAi has been used to target weeds that tolerate Roundup. RNAi can be mixed with a silicone surfactant that lets the RNA molecules enter air-exchange holes in the plant's surface. This disrupted the gene for tolerance long enough to let the herbicide work. This strategy would allow the continued use of glyphosate-based herbicides.

They can be made with enough precision to target specific insect species. Monsanto is developing an RNA spray to kill Colorado potato beetles. One challenge is to make it stay on the plant for a week, even if it's raining. The potato beetle has become resistant to more than 60 conventional insecticides.

Monsanto lobbied the U.S. EPA to exempt RNAi pesticide products from any specific regulations (beyond those that apply to all pesticides) and be exempted from rodent toxicity, allergenicity and residual environmental testing. In 2014 an EPA advisory group found little evidence of a risk to people from eating RNA.

However, in 2012, the Australian Safe Food Foundation claimed that the RNA trigger designed to change the starch content of wheat might interfere with the gene for a human liver enzyme. Supporters countered that RNA does not appear to survive human saliva or stomach acids. The US National Honey Bee Advisory Board told EPA that using RNAi would put natural systems at "the epitome of risk". The beekeepers cautioned that pollinators could be hurt by unintended effects and that the genomes of many insects are still undetermined. Other unassessed risks include ecological (given the need for sustained presence for herbicides) and possible RNA drift across species boundaries.

Monsanto invested in multiple companies for their RNA expertise, including Beeologics (for RNA that kills a parasitic mite that infests hives and for manufacturing technology) and Preceres (nanoparticle lipidoid coatings) and licensed technology from Alnylam and Tekmira. In 2012 Syngenta acquired Devgen, a European RNA partner. Startup Forest Innovations is investigating RNAi as a solution to citrus greening disease that in 2014 caused 22 percent of oranges in Florida to fall off the trees.

Mycopesticide 
Mycopesticides include fungi and fungi cell components. Propagules such as conidia, blastospores, chlamydospores, oospores, and zygospores have been evaluated, along with hydrolytic enzyme mixtures. The role of hydrolytic enzymes especially chitinases in the killing process, and the possible use of chitin synthesis inhibitors are the prime research areas.

Nanotechnology 
The encapsulation of some biological compounds in nanoparticulate systems has been shown to improve their effectiveness against pests, reduce their toxicity toward people and the environment, and lessen the losses caused by physical deterioration (such as volatilization and leaching). Thus, nanotechnology may aid in the creation of less toxic biopesticides with acceptable safety profiles, greater active agent stability, improved efficacy against the intended pests, and higher end-user acceptance. Neem (Azadirachta indica) oil can be effectively protected from quick degradation by the use of nanoparticles, providing a more sustained action on the intended pests. The biodegradable polymers utilised in this type of formulation enable continuous administration of the active ingredient with no damage to the environment. Because there is currently a lack of extensive understanding regarding risk assessment factors and the subsequent toxicity of nanoparticles towards components of agroecosystems after their release into the environment, future research must focus on ways to avoid the risks associated with the use of nanoparticles.

Examples 
Bacillus thuringiensis is a bacterium capable of causing disease of Lepidoptera, Coleoptera and Diptera. The toxin from B. thuringiensis (Bt toxin) has been incorporated directly into plants via genetic engineering. Bt toxin manufacturers claim it has little effect on other organisms, and is more environmentally friendly than synthetic pesticides.

Other microbial control agents include products based on:
 entomopathogenic fungi (e.g. Beauveria bassiana, Isaria fumosorosea, Lecanicillium and Metarhizium spp.),
 plant disease control agents: include Trichoderma spp. and Ampelomyces quisqualis (a hyperparasite of grape powdery mildew); Bacillus subtilis is also used to control plant pathogens.
 beneficial nematodes attacking insects (e.g. Steinernema feltiae) or slugs (e.g. Phasmarhabditis hermaphrodita) 
 entomopathogenic viruses (e.g.. Cydia pomonella granulovirus).
 weeds and rodents have been controlled with microbial agents.

Various animal, fungal, and plant  organisms and extracts have been used as biopesticides. Products in this category include:
 Insect pheromones and other semiochemicals
 Fermentation products such as Spinosad (a macrocyclic lactone)
 Chitosan: a plant in the presence of this product naturally induces systemic resistance (ISR) to allow the plant to defend itself against disease, pathogens and pests.
 Biopesticides may include natural plant-derived products, which include alkaloids, terpenoids, phenolics and other secondary chemicals. Vegetable oils such as canola oil have pesticidal properties. Products based on plant extracts such as garlic have now been registered in the EU and elsewhere.

Applications 
Microbial agents, effective control requires appropriate formulation and application.

Biopesticides have established themselves on a variety of crops for use against crop disease. For example, biopesticides help control downy mildew diseases. Their benefits include: a 0-day pre-harvest interval (see: maximum residue limit), success under moderate to severe disease pressure, and the ability to use as a tank mix or in a rotational program with other fungicides. Because some market studies estimate that as much as 20% of global fungicide sales are directed at downy mildew diseases, the integration of biofungicides into grape production has substantial benefits by extending the useful life of other fungicides, especially those in the reduced-risk category.

A major growth area for biopesticides is in the area of seed treatments and soil amendments. Fungicidal and biofungicidal seed treatments are used to control soil-borne fungal pathogens that cause seed rot, damping-off, root rot and seedling blights. They can also be used to control internal seed-borne fungal pathogens as well as fungal pathogens on the seed surface. Many biofungicidal products show capacities to stimulate plant host defense and other physiological processes that can make treated crops more resistant to stresses.

Disadvantages 
 High specificity: which may require an exact identification of the pest/pathogen and the use of multiple products used; although this can also be an advantage in that the biopesticide is less likely to harm non-target species
 Slow action speed (thus making them unsuitable if a pest outbreak is an immediate threat)
 Variable efficacy due to the influences of various factors (since some biopesticides are living organisms, which bring about pest/pathogen control by multiplying within or nearby the target pest/pathogen)
 Living organisms evolve and increase their tolerance to control. If the target population is not exterminated or rendered incapable of reproduction, the surviving population can acquire tolerance of whatever pressures are brought to bear, resulting in an evolutionary arms race.
 Unintended consequences: Studies have found broad spectrum biopesticides have lethal and nonlethal risks for non-target native pollinators such as Melipona quadrifasciata in Brazil.

Market research
The market for agricultural biologicals was forecast to reach $19.5 billion by 2031.

See also 

 Antagonism (phytopathology)
 Bioherbicide
 Biological pest control
 Cembratrienol
 Integrated Pest Management
 LUBILOSA
 Pest resistance management plans
 Plant defense against herbivory
 Use as a population control agent

References

External links

 Bioinsecticides Market (Acquire Market Research)
 Registered Biopesticides 04/29/02 United States Environmental Protection Agency. Updated 29 March 2002. Retrieved 25 November 2011.
 International Biocontrol Manufacturers' Association (IBMA)

 
Biotechnology
Biological pest control